Wamphray railway station served Newton Wamphray, near Beattock, in the Scottish county of Dumfries and Galloway. It was served by local trains on what is now known as the West Coast Main Line. The nearest station for Newton Wamphray is now at Lockerbie. It was originally known as Wamphraygate.

History 
Opened by the Caledonian Railway, it became part of the London Midland and Scottish Railway during the Grouping of 1923 and was then closed by British Railways in 1960.

A description in 1848 records the following:

The station building is now a private dwelling and the platforms have been demolished. In 1868 John Bell was the stationmaster.

The site today 
Trains pass at speed on the electrified West Coast Main Line but there is no station at the site now.

References

Notes

Sources

External links
 Station photograph

Disused railway stations in Dumfries and Galloway
Railway stations in Great Britain opened in 1847
Railway stations in Great Britain closed in 1960
Former Caledonian Railway stations
1847 establishments in Scotland
1960 disestablishments in Scotland